"Between the Lines" is a song by Swedish singer-songwriter Robyn, recorded for her eighth studio album Honey. It was released as the third single from the album on 3rd April 2019 alongside a music video by Ssion. Remixes by Louie Vega, The Black Madonna and Preditah followed on April 12, 19 and 26 respectfully.

Music video
The Ssion-directed video, filmed with a camcorder, depicts the singer partying in Ibiza, performing at a festival, and singing in a makeshift ball pit. Inspired by Wham!'s "Club Tropicana" video, Ssion attempted to capture "the aggressive tackiness of tourist culture slapped up against the serene beach vibes" with the "DIY" aesthetic of the video.

Composition
The song features "latin flair, trappy electro-synth and burly AutoTune".

Live performance
Robyn performed the song in a medley with "Love Is Free" on The Tonight Show with Jimmy Fallon on 18 July 2019 and during the Honey Tour throughout 2019. During the show in Montreal on March 13, she struggled to remember some of the lyrics and sang "I don't know my lines" towards the end.

Release
On 20 June 2020, Robyn released "Between the Lines" on a limited edition 12" vinyl featuring remixes of the song along with "Beach 2k20". It was released as part of a Honey Remix vinyl series, alongside "Honey", "Baby Forgive Me" and "Ever Again", for the Love Record Stores Day 2020 event. Only 500 of each were manufactured.

Track listing

Personnel
Credits adapted from the liner notes of Honey.
 Robyn – vocals, vocal arranging, songwriting, co-production, vocal recording
 Klas Åhlund - songwriting, production, programming, vocal recording
 NealHPogue – mixing
 Mike Bozzi – mastering

Charts

References

2019 singles
2018 songs
Robyn songs
Songs written by Robyn
Songs written by Klas Åhlund